KEJB may refer to:

 KEJB (AM), a radio station (1480 AM) licensed to serve Eureka, California, United States
 KEJB (TV), a defunct television station (channel 43) formerly licensed to serve El Dorado, Arkansas, United States